Caenides is a genus of skippers in the family Hesperiidae.

Species
Caenides benga (Holland, 1891) – yellow-patch recluse
Caenides dacela (Hewitson, 1876) – common recluse
Caenides dacenilla Aurivillius, 1925 – no-spot recluse
Caenides hidaroides Aurivillius, 1896 – Aurivillius' recluse
Caenides kangvensis Holland, 1896 – yellow-spotted recluse
Caenides otilia Belcastro, 1990 – Otilia's recluse
Caenides sophia (Evans, 1937)  
Caenides soritia (Hewitson, 1876) – well-spotted recluse
Caenides xychus (Mabille, 1891) – unbranded recluse

Former species
Caenides dacena (Hewitson, 1876) - transferred to Hypoleucis dacena (Hewitson, 1876)

References

External links
Natural History Museum Lepidoptera genus database
Seitz, A. Die Gross-Schmetterlinge der Erde 13: Die Afrikanischen Tagfalter. Plate XIII 80

Hesperiinae
Hesperiidae genera